Emblethis is a genus of dirt-colored seed bugs in the family Rhyparochromidae. There are more than 30 described species in Emblethis.

Species
These 32 species belong to the genus Emblethis:

 Emblethis amplus Seidenstucker, 1987
 Emblethis angustus Montandon, 1890
 Emblethis brachynotus Horvath, 1897
 Emblethis brachypterus Linnavuori, 1953
 Emblethis brevicornis Horvath, 1904
 Emblethis ciliatus Horvath, 1875
 Emblethis denticollis Horvath, 1878
 Emblethis dilaticollis (Jakovlev, 1874)
 Emblethis duplicatus Seidenstucker, 1963
 Emblethis filicornis Linnavuori, 1954
 Emblethis gracilicornis Puton, 1883
 Emblethis griseus (Wolff, 1802)
 Emblethis horvathiana Hutchinson, 1934
 Emblethis karamanus Seidenstucker, 1963
 Emblethis latus Seidenstucker, 1966
 Emblethis luridus Jakovlev, 1904
 Emblethis major Montandon, 1890
 Emblethis minutus Kiritshenko, 1911
 Emblethis nigricans Popov, 1964
 Emblethis nox Kiritshenko, 1912
 Emblethis osmanus Seidenstucker, 1963
 Emblethis parvus Montandon, 1890
 Emblethis persicus Josifov, 1965
 Emblethis proximus Seidenstucker, 1967
 Emblethis pusillus Priesner & Alfieri, 1953
 Emblethis robustus Josifov, 1965
 Emblethis sabulosus Seidenstucker, 1963
 Emblethis semenovi Kiritshenko, 1911
 Emblethis setifer Seidenstucker, 1966
 Emblethis solitarius Jakovlev, 1881
 Emblethis verbasci (Fabricius, 1803)
 Emblethis vicarius Horvath, 1908 (sand bug)

References

External links

 

Rhyparochromidae
Articles created by Qbugbot